Matthew Stanley Lepsis (born January 13, 1974) is a former American football offensive tackle of the National Football League (NFL). He was originally signed by the Denver Broncos as an undrafted free agent in 1997 and remained with the team until his retirement following the 2007 season. He played college football at Colorado.

Lepsis won Super Bowl XXXIII as a member of the Broncos.

Early years
Matt Lepsis attended Frisco High School in Frisco, Texas, and was a letterman in football and track and field. In football, he was an All-Southwest selection and was named the Class 3A Defensive Player of the Year as a senior. In track and field, he was a two-time State Discus Champion.

College career
Lepsis went to the University of Colorado, where he earned All-Big Eight Conference honors as a tight end.

Professional career
Lepsis was signed by the Denver Broncos as an undrafted free agent in 1997. He did not miss an offensive snap on a 2004 line that set a franchise record by allowing only 15 sacks, shattering the previous best of 22 sacks set in 1971, to rank third in the NFL.

In Week 7 of the 2006 season, he suffered a season-ending knee injury in a 17-7 victory over the Cleveland Browns. He once again suffered a season-ending injury, in the 2007 season. On January 1, 2008, he announced to his team that he would be retiring after his performance slipped in 2007 and wanted to end his career on his own terms. He officially retired on February 12, 2008.

External links
Denver Broncos bio 

1974 births
Living people
People from Conroe, Texas
American football tight ends
American football offensive tackles
Colorado Buffaloes football players
Denver Broncos players
Barcelona Dragons players